Victory Heights is a neighborhood in the Lake City district of Seattle, Washington. It was named after the Victory Highway, which formed the eastern border of the area. The highway was originally called the Gerhart Erickson Road, the namesake of which was Gerhart Erickson, who sponsored the Good Roads legislation in 1903. The road was then renamed Bothell Road, changed to Victory Highway in 1924, before returning to Bothell Road; it is now called Lake City Way NE. The neighborhood was annexed to the city of Seattle in 1954.

References

External links